The Cummings Creek Bridge was a historic iron bridge about  northwest of Round Top, Texas. It was fabricated by the King Iron Bridge Company of Cleveland, Ohio. It was erected in situ by the bridge company's agent S.A. Oliver in 1890. It was listed on the National Register of Historic Places on April 21, 1975, and designated a Texas State Antiquities Landmark by the Texas Historical Commission on January 1, 1981.

It was an example of a 19th-century through truss bridge. The single span bridge covered  with each Pratt truss having 8 panels. Signage atop the north end identifies the builder and year of manufacture.

References

External links
 

National Register of Historic Places in Fayette County, Texas
Buildings and structures completed in 1890